Altman may refer to:
 Altman (surname)
 Altman (automobile), Ohio-based manufacturer
 Altman (film), a 2014 documentary film about film director Robert Altman
 Altman Lighting Co., American lighting manufacturer
 Altman, Colorado, a ghost town
 Altman, West Virginia

See also
 Altmann (disambiguation)